Josef Schmidt was an Austrian wrestler. He competed in the men's Greco-Roman welterweight at the 1948 Summer Olympics.

References

External links
 

Year of birth missing
Possibly living people
Austrian male sport wrestlers
Olympic wrestlers of Austria
Wrestlers at the 1948 Summer Olympics
Place of birth missing